X Troop may refer to:

No. 10 (Inter-Allied) Commando#No. 3 (X) Troop
A section from No. 11 Special Air Service Battalion that conducted Operation Colossus